The 1948 Colorado A&M Aggies football team represented Colorado State College of Agriculture and Mechanic Arts in the Skyline Six Conference during the 1948 college football season.  In their second season under head coach Bob Davis, the Aggies compiled an 8–3 record (4–1 against MSC opponents), lost to Occidental in the 1949 Raisin Bowl, and outscored all opponents by a total of 244 to 138.

Eight Colorado Agricultural players received all-conference honors in 1948: fullback Don Mullison, fullback Thurman "Fum" McGraw, end George Jones, halfback Eddie Hana, guard Dale Dodrill, halfback Ollie Woods, quarterback Bob Hainlen, and tackle Don Hoch. Bob Davis was also named Skyline Conference Coach of the Year.

Schedule

References

Colorado AandM
Colorado State Rams football seasons
Colorado AandM Aggies football